In enzymology, an aryl-aldehyde oxidase is an enzyme that catalyzes the chemical reaction

an aromatic aldehyde + O2 + H2O  an aromatic carboxylic acid + H2O2

The 3 substrates of this enzyme are aromatic aldehyde, O2, and H2O, whereas its two products are aromatic carboxylic acid and H2O2.

This enzyme belongs to the family of oxidoreductases, specifically those acting on the aldehyde or oxo group of donor with oxygen as acceptor.  The systematic name of this enzyme class is aryl-aldehyde:oxygen oxidoreductase.

References

 

EC 1.2.3
Enzymes of unknown structure